O Holy Night! is a 1996 Christmas album by Christian singer Sandi Patty released on Word Records. It is her sixteenth and second Christmas album (her first since 1983's Christmas: The Gift Goes On) with six tracks produced by Patty's long-time producer Greg Nelson and five songs selected from the 1992 Hallmark Christmas album Celebrate Christmas! produced by Fred Salem with arrangements conducted by David T. Clydesdale featuring the London Symphony Orchestra. The album peaked at number 7 on the Top Christian Albums chart, number 8 on the Top Holiday Albums chart and number 143 on the Top 200 Albums chart on Billboard magazine.

Track listing

Note: (*) - tracks were produced in 1992 by Fred Salem, tracks arranged by David T. Clydesdale. All other tracks produced by Greg Nelson.

Charts

References

1996 Christmas albums
Sandi Patty albums
Word Records albums